Snohomish High School (SHS) is a secondary school located in the Snohomish School District, in Snohomish, Washington, United States. SHS, built for 1200 students, contains 1,689 9th–12th graders (as of 2016–17).  The school serves primarily those students living north of the Snohomish River (nearby Glacier Peak High School, serving those students living south of the river).

History
Before SHS actually opened it was a courthouse with a small jail section underneath. SHS first opened in 1894 at the completion of the original A building.  The school underwent many remodels through the 1980s, including changes to the B building. These changes removed the last vestiges of 'old' Snohomish High School, making the building completely modern. Among the changes made to the B building were the removal of its decades-old fixed wooden bleachers and over-painting of many student-painted murals from the 1960s and earlier. There were also additions of music, science, and vocational buildings during this time. In an attempt to curb overcrowding, the C building was constructed and opened in 1999, adding ten more classrooms. As the school became more crowded, it received a grant to remodel the campus, tearing down the B building was a major change. Parts of B building have been incorporated into the schools newer buildings.

Notable alumni

 Earl Averill Jr. - MLB player with the Cleveland Indians, Chicago Cubs, Chicago White Sox, Philadelphia Phillies, and an original member of the Los Angeles Angels; All American at University of Oregon
 Jon Brockman - NBA basketball player with the Sacramento Kings, Milwaukee Bucks, and Houston Rockets; college standout at Washington
 Tom Cable - head coach of the NFL Oakland Raiders (2008–10), 2011 assistant coach and offensive line coach of the Seattle Seahawks and Idaho Vandals (2000–03)
 Adam Eaton - drafted by Philadelphia Phillies, debuted May 20, 2000
 Rick Fenney - NFL running back
 Keith Gilbertson - former college football head coach at Idaho (1986–88), California (1992–95), and Washington (2003–04)
 Roy Grover - former MLB player with the Philadelphia Athletics and Washington Senators
 Kevin Hamlin - NASCAR Nationwide Series and Truck Series driver
 Steve Hardin - CFL player offensive guard
 Bret Ingalls - offensive line coach of the New Orleans Saints and 27 years in college football; won 2009 Super Bowl XLIV in his first season with Saints
 Curt Marsh - NFL lineman drafted by the Raiders
 Jeff Ogden - NFL wide receiver
 Jim Ollom - MLB pitcher 1966-67, Minnesota Twins
 John Patric - writer and satirical political candidate
 Don Poier - sports broadcaster
 Chrissy Teigen - model
 Earl Torgeson -  former MLB player with the Boston Braves, Philadelphia Phillies, Detroit Tigers, Chicago White Sox, and New York Yankees
 Chris Reykdal - Washington State Superintendent of public schools 2017

References

External links
 
 Official Snohomish School District website

Educational institutions established in 1894
High schools in Snohomish County, Washington
Public high schools in Washington (state)
1894 establishments in Washington (state)